Pope Sergius II (died 27 January 847) was the bishop of Rome and ruler of the Papal States from January 844 to his death in 847. Sergius II's pontificate saw the Arab raid against Rome as well as the city's redevelopment.

Rise
Born to a noble family, Sergius was educated in the schola cantorum and ordained cardinal-priest of the Church of Sts. Martin and Sylvester by Pope Paschal I. Under Pope Gregory IV, he became archpriest.

At a preliminary meeting to designate a successor to Gregory IV, who died in January 844, Sergius was nominated by the aristocracy, while the people of Rome declared for the deacon John. The opposition was suppressed, with Sergius intervening to save John's life. John was, however, shut up in a monastery, and Sergius was duly consecrated, without seeking ratification of the Frankish court. Emperor Lothair I, however, disapproved of this abandonment of the Constitutio Romana of 824, which included a statute that no pope should be consecrated until his election had imperial approval. He sent an army under his son Louis, the recently appointed king of Italy, to re-establish his authority. The Church and the emperor reached an accommodation, with Sergius crowning Louis as king, but the pope did not accede to all the demands made upon him.

Pontificate
Sergius contributed to urban redevelopment in Rome, improving churches, aqueducts, and the Lateran Basilica. He and his brother, Benedict, funded their building plans by selling appointments to various church positions to the highest bidder.

During his pontificate, the outskirts of Rome were ravaged, and the churches of St. Peter and St. Paul were sacked by Arabs, who also approached Portus and Ostia in August 846. During the raid, he and the people of Rome looked on helplessly as they hid behind the Aurelian walls. Despite having been forewarned of the intentions of the raiders, Sergius is seen as having not acted adequately enough to prepare for that which eventuated.

Sergius died while negotiating between the patriarchs of Aquileia and Grado. He was succeeded by Leo IV.

Popular culture
Pope Sergius was portrayed by John Goodman in the 2009 film Pope Joan.

References

Sources

Cheetham, Nicolas, Keepers of the Keys, New York: Charles Scribner's Sons, 1983.

External links
 Opera Omnia by Migne Patrologia Latina with analytical indexes

Italian popes
Popes
847 deaths
9th-century archbishops
Year of birth unknown
9th-century popes
Burials at St. Peter's Basilica